Wayne Graves (born 18 September 1980) is an English retired footballer who played as a right midfielder in the Football League for Scunthorpe United.

References

External links

1980 births
Living people
English footballers
Association football midfielders
Scunthorpe United F.C. players
Kidderminster Harriers F.C. players
English Football League players
Sportspeople from Scunthorpe